Deh Shirin-e Badengan (also Romanized as Deh Shīrīn-e Bādengān; also known as Deh Shīrīn) is a village in Pataveh Rural District, Pataveh District, Dana County, Kohgiluyeh and Boyer-Ahmad Province, Iran. At the 2006 census, its population was 264, in 48 families.

References 

Populated places in Dana County